Frédéric Falcon (born 21 November 1985) is a French businessman and politician of the National Rally. He was elected as a deputy for the National Assembly representing Aude's 2nd constituency during the 2022 French legislative election.

Biography
Falcon was born in Besançon in 1985. He stated that he often moved due to his father's career in the military but has family connections to Narbonne. Falcon studied history and geography at university in Doubs before completing Master's degrees in geopolitics and heritage management. He worked for Capgemini in Paris before starting a real-estate business and became a business consultant in the property sector.

Political career
Falcon joined the Union for a Popular Movement as a student and canvassed for the party. He left the UMP in 2014 after disagreeing with its course. He joined the National Rally in 2017 through Sébastien Chenu. Ahead of the 2022 French legislative election, he was selected to stand in Aude's 2nd constituency and made it to the second round of voting. He subsequently unseated the incumbent deputy Alain Perea to win the seat and was one of three FN deputies to represent all of Aude's constituencies.

References 

Living people
1985 births
Deputies of the 16th National Assembly of the French Fifth Republic
National Rally (France) politicians
21st-century French politicians
Members of Parliament for Bouches-du-Rhône
Businesspeople from Besançon
Politicians from Besançon